Todd Gray is the executive chef and co-owner of Equinox, a restaurant in Washington, D.C., and of Manna, an upscale restaurant located in the Museum of the Bible.

Biography
Gray was born in Washington, D.C. He studied art at the undergraduate level at the University of Richmond, but decided to change to the culinary arts and studied at the Culinary Institute of America. After this, he was an intern in some of the country's popular kitchens, following which he spent four years learning from Robert Greault in a French restaurant, and then seven years in an Italian one with Roberto Donna. He was a 5 time James Beard Award Nominee for Best Chef Mid-Atlantic. He and his wife Ellen Kassoff Gray have created the cookbook The New Jewish Table.

In 2018, he drew attention for beginning to serve a sweet resin found on shrubs in the Middle East including tamarisk, that is thought by many scholars to the Biblical food manna at his restaurant, Manna.

TV appearances
He was the host of an episode of Chefs A' Field and he was a guest in an episode of Tyler's Ultimate. In 2016 he was a contestant on Beat Bobby Flay, and lost to Flay in the second round. He was also on an episode of "Guy's Grocery Games".

References

External links
Cork and Knife
Food and Wine

Year of birth missing (living people)
Living people
American male chefs
Episcopal High School (Alexandria, Virginia) alumni
Chefs from Washington, D.C.
Culinary Institute of America alumni
Reality cooking competition contestants